The 1994 OFC Women's Championship was the fifth edition of the OFC Women's Championship. Papua New Guinea hosted the tournament between 14 and 20 October 1994. The tournament was contested by three sides and played as a round robin. Australia won on goal difference after tying with New Zealand on points. They qualified for the 1995 FIFA Women's World Cup as a result.

Participants

Results

Goalscorers
3 goals
  Cheryl Salisbury
  Wendy Sharpe
2 goals
  Lisa Casagrande
  Alison Forman
  Sunni Hughes
  Karly Pumpa
  Donna Baker
  Kim Dermott
1 goal
  Julie Murray
  Amanda Crawford
  Wendi Henderson
  Maureen Jacobson
Own goal
  Unknown player

See also
 1995 FIFA Women's World Cup qualification

References

External links
 Oceania Football Confederation official website

1994–95 in OFC football
OFC Women's Nations Cup tournaments
1995 FIFA Women's World Cup qualification
1994 in women's association football
International association football competitions hosted by Papua New Guinea
1994 in Papua New Guinean sport